Adams method may refer to:

 A method for the numerical solution of ordinary differential equations, also known as the linear multistep method
 A method for apportionment of seats among states in the parliament, a kind of a highest-averages method